The First of the Microbe Hunters is the fifth EP by English-French rock band Stereolab. It was released on 16 May 2000 in the United Kingdom by Duophonic Records and in the United States by Elektra Records. Its title makes reference to the book Microbe Hunters by Paul de Kruif, in which the first chapter is dedicated to Dutch scientist Anton van Leeuwenhoek, named "the first of the microbe hunters". Its tracks were re-released in the band's 2021 compilation Electrically Possessed.

Reception

The First of the Microbe Hunters was met with mixed reviews from music critics. At Metacritic, which assigns a normalized rating out of 100 to reviews from mainstream publications, the album received an average score of 59, based on eight reviews.

Track listing

Personnel
Credits are adapted from the album's liner notes.

Stereolab
 Stereolab – all instruments, mixing
 Lætitia Sadier
 Tim Gane
 Mary Hansen
 Simon Johns
 Morgane Lhote
 Andy Ramsay
 Fulton Dingley – recording, mixing
 House – sleeve design
 John McEntire  – recording and mixing (track 5)
 Sean O'Hagan – additional instruments

Notes

References

2000 albums
Stereolab EPs